The KIS TR-4 Cruiser is a four place composite homebuilt aircraft design.

Design and development
The KIS cruiser is an all composite tricycle gear, low-wing, four-place homebuilt aircraft.

Variants
Super Sport Cruiser
Version powered by a 210 hp Continental IO-360 with a constant speed propeller

Specifications (KIS TR-4 Cruiser)

See also

References

External links

KIS TR-4
1990s United States sport aircraft
1990s United States civil utility aircraft
Single-engined tractor aircraft
Low-wing aircraft
Homebuilt aircraft